The Bartow Downtown Commercial District (also known as the Old Polk County Courthouse) is a historic district in central Bartow, Florida.  Composed of an area bounded by Floral and 1st Avenues and Main and Vine Streets, the district includes 204 contributing properties.  It was added to the National Register of Historic Places in 1993.

References

External links
 Polk County listings at National Register of Historic Places

National Register of Historic Places in Polk County, Florida
Historic districts on the National Register of Historic Places in Florida
Bartow, Florida
1993 establishments in Florida